This is a list of properties and districts in Hall County, Georgia that are listed on the National Register of Historic Places (NRHP).

Current listings

|}

References

Hall
Buildings and structures in Hall County, Georgia